Corrie Hekker (1957 in Amsterdam), stage name Kimm or Kimm Hekker, is a Dutch singer, active 1976-1983. The duet of Stevie Nicks
with Kenny Loggins "Whenever I Call You Friend" was televised by TopPop replacing Nicks by Kimm, which
brought them a No.13 chart hit in 1978.

Discography
Gimme a Break, album CBS Netherlands 1978.
A1	Jaimie	
A2	This Is My Day	
A3	Wind Of Change	
A4	Gimme A Break	
A5	Songbird	
B1	Love's Destination	
B2	What's His Name/What's His Number
B3	Might Have To Cry	
B4	Will I See You Anymore	
B5	House Of Strangers

References

1957 births
Living people